Joseph Samuel Christian Frederick Frey (born Joseph Levi; 1771–1850) was a missionary to Jews. In 1809 he founded the London Society for promoting Christianity amongst the Jews after disagreements with the London Missionary Society.

Works
 Joseph and Benjamin: letters on the controversy between Jews and Christians : comprising the most important doctrines of the Christian religion.  1837
 A Hebrew, Latin and English Dictionary; containing all the Hebrew and Chaldee Words used in the Old Testament, published in 1815 by Gale and Fenner, Paternoster-Row
 Narrative of the Rev. Joseph Samuel C. F. Frey, 1834,  digital at archive.org

References

1771 births
1850 deaths
English Jews
English Anglican missionaries
Hebrew Christian movement